Alice Russell (born 1 March 1975 in Suffolk, England) is a British soul singer. She is the daughter of an organist, and grew up in Framlingham, Suffolk. At the age of nine, following in her father and sisters' musical footsteps, Russell began taking lessons on the cello, and sang in choirs, before studying art and music in Brighton from 1994.

As well as the classical influences of her father, and formal music lessons, Russell began finding influence in gospel music and soul artists such as Stevie Wonder and Aretha Franklin from an early age which played a big part in the shaping of her style. Artists including Minnie Riperton, Eva Cassidy, Chaka Khan and Jill Scott are listed by Alice Russell as influences.

Early career
Russell began making a name for herself in the early 2000s, contributing to recordings by Bah Samba, Quantic, TM Juke, Kushti and Nostalgia 77.

Her work with Bah Samba infused Latin sounds with tinges of uplifting jazz and funk, whereas her material with the band Kushti contained a more laid back, hip hop and soul inspired sound. Her debut album, Under The Munka Moon was released on the Tru Thoughts label in 2004, which was an amalgamation of various singles, remixes and collaborations.

In 2005, her debut studio album My Favourite Letters was recorded on the Tru Thoughts label. Created by Russell with co-writer, producer, guitarist and musical friend Alex Cowan (a.k.a. TM Juke), the album received positive reviews. Her third release, Under the Munka Moon II (Tru Thoughts) in 2006 compiled her most recent collaborations, remixes, and cover versions including an interpretation of The White Stripes' "Seven Nation Army". The Alice Russell – Live in Paris DVD also came out in 2006, and was the first DVD the Tru Thoughts label had released. Russell and TM Juke have been touring together since 2006 with chosen sidemen, performing to audiences in the UK, Europe, Australia, the US and in other countries. In summer 2006, Daddy G of Massive Attack requested Russell play the main stage at The Big Chill. Russell has also supported Lonnie Liston Smith, Femi Kuti, De La Soul and appeared on the bill with Amy Winehouse for the British showcase at the Midem Music Conference in Cannes 2007.

Her cover of "For Once in My Life" was featured in a British TV advertisement for clothing brand J.D.Williams in 2016.

Pot of Gold
In 2008, Russell released the album, Pot of Gold, which was released in November on the Six Degrees Records label in the US and Russell's own label Little Poppet in the UK.

She also collaborated with Ninja Tune's Mr Scruff on "Music Takes Me Up", a single from the latter's 2008 album, Ninja Tuna. Russell toured throughout the end of 2008 into 2009, performing shows in Australia, Europe, Canada and America, including the South By South West Music and Media Conference in Austin, Texas in March 2009, where she performed four shows. Due to the collapse of Pinnacle distribution in 2008, Pot of Gold was re-released in October 2009 on the Little Poppet label, accompanied by the release of the 22-track, double CD Pot of Gold Remixes album, featuring mixes by Mr Scruff, DJ Vadim, Emika, Ste Simpson and The Heavy, amongst others. The releases were supported by more European and UK tour dates.

David Byrne's Here Lies Love until To Dust
April 2010 saw the release of Russell's collaboration with David Byrne and Fatboy Slim for their studio album Here Lies Love, containing the track "Men Will Do Anything" featuring Russell on vocals.

Russell toured throughout Europe in 2010, and in February 2010 announced a stripped back show at London's Union Chapel on 21 May. Russell released her new studio album To Dust on Tru Thoughts Records in February 2013, preceded by the single "Heartbreaker".  To Dust earned a four star rating from Allmusic.

Discography
 Under the Munka Moon (2004, Tru Thoughts)
 My Favourite Letters (2005, Tru Thoughts)
 Under the Munka Moon II (2006, Tru Thoughts)
 Pot of Gold (2008, Little Poppet/Differ-ant/Six Degrees)
 Pot of Gold Remixes (2009, Little Poppet/Differ-ant/Six Degrees)
 Quantic & Alice Russell with The Combo Bárbaro: Look Around the Corner (2012, Tru Thoughts)
 To Dust (2013, Tru Thoughts/Differ-ant)

References

External links

1975 births
Living people
English soul singers
People from Framlingham
21st-century English women singers
21st-century English singers
Six Degrees Records artists